Lemongello is a surname. Notable people with the surname include:

 Mark Lemongello (born 1955), American baseball player
 Peter Lemongello (born 1947), American singer